Halama is both a Polish and Hawaiian surname. 

Notable Polish people with the surname include:

Grzegorz Halama (born 1970), Polish parodist and cabaret actor
Jan Halama (born 1988), Czech footballer
John Halama (born 1972), American baseball player
Kimo Halama, Hawaii Five-0 character 
Loda Halama (1911-1996), Polish dancer and actress
Marco Halama (born 1997), Slovak ice hockey player
Václav Halama (1940–2017), Czech former football goalkeeper and coach

Polish-language surnames